Harold Lipstein (June 14, 1898 – October 8, 1974) was an American cinematographer. He was nominated for an Academy Award in the category Best Cinematography for the film A Man Called Peter.

Selected filmography 
A Man Called Peter (1955)

References

External links 

1898 births
1974 deaths
Emigrants from the Russian Empire to the United States
American cinematographers